The 1918 Ohio gubernatorial election was held on November 5, 1918. Incumbent Democrat James M. Cox defeated Republican nominee Frank B. Willis in their third consecutive contest with 50.62% of the vote.

General election

Candidates
James M. Cox, Democratic
Frank B. Willis, Republican

Results

References

1918
Ohio
Gubernatorial